Mar Sabor and Mar Proth, according to Syrian Malabar Christian tradition, were two Chaldean Assyrian bishops who landed in the port of Kollam (in present-day Kerala) by the help of a Nestorian merchant, Sabr Iso in 823 AD. The mission is said to have received permission from the then king of Kerala to build a church in Kollam.

That the historicity of this mission cannot be verified does not dispute the epigraphical evidence that Christians were on the Malabar Coast in 9th century AD. Kollam Syrian copper plates, a 9th-century royal grant from Kerala, mentions that certain Maruvan Sapir Iso built a church at Kollam with the blessing of the then Emperor of Kerala. It is likely that Mar Sapir had a companion named Mar Prot. A stone cross, one of the five Persian Crosses, with Sassanid Pahlavi inscription recovered also mentions certain "Afras the Syrian" as "the son of Chaharabukht".

The two bishops are said to have died in Kerala and have been considered as saints by the Jacobite Syrian Church and Malankara Orthodox Syrian Church.

Veneration
Sabor and Aproth were highly venerated in India among the Saint Thomas Christian community. A number of churches including Kottakkavu, Udayamperur, Kayamkulam, Kollam and Kothanallur, were dedicated to these saints. 

MS Vatican Syriac N. iv., which is dated to 1556 and written in the Kottakkavu Kandīshā Church, has the following colophon in folio 278:
 "By the help of our Lord we have finished this book of the Prophets; it was written on a Monday, the 18th of February, in the year 1556 of the birth of our Lord. I, priest Jacob, the disciple of Mar Jacob, and from the village of Puraur, have written this book in the holy Church of Mar Shapur and Mar Iapot [Aprot]. May the holy name of God be praised for ever. Amen!"

Variations of the names 
Mar is a Syriac term meaning 'Saint'

Mar Sapir (T. K. Joseph) - Sabor
 Mar Prot (Land) - Prodh (T. K. Joseph and Gouva)/Proth - Firous (La Croz) - Aphrottu (Burnell)/Aphroth  - Ambrose (Swanston)

Major studies

Recent 

 The Kollam Plates in the World of the Ninth Century Indian Ocean. Delhi: Primus Books (upcoming).
 M. R. Raghava Varier and K. Veluthat, 2013. Tarissāppaḷḷippaṭṭayam, Trivandrum: National Book Stall
 C. G. Cereti, 'The Pahlavi Signatures on the Quilon Copper Plates', in Exegisti Monument (Wiesbaden: Harrasowitz, 2009).
 C. G. Cereti, L. M. Olivieri, and J. Vazhuthanapally, 'The Problem of the Saint Thomas Crosses and Related Questions', East and West 52:1/ 4 (2002).
 M. G. S. Narayanan, Cultural Symbiosis in Kerala (Trivandrum: Kerala Historical Society, 1972).
W. Baum and R. Senoner (eds. and trans.), Indien und Europa im Mittelalter: Die Eingliederung des Kontinents in das europäische Bewußtsein bis ins 15. Jahrhundert (Klagenfurt: Kitab, 2000).

Others 

 Travancore Archaeological Series, Volume II, no. 9 (I and II).
 C. P . T. Winckworth, 'A New Interpretation of the Pahlavi Cross Inscriptions', Kerala Society Papers, no. 3.
 Land, 'Brief History of the Syrians of Malabar'. Anedocta Syriaca, I.
 Joseph, T. K., 'Mar Sapir and Mar Prodh', Indian Antiquary, 1928, III.
A. Mingana, “The Early Spread of Christianity in India”, Bulletin of John Ryland's Library 10:2 (1926).
 W. Logan, Malabar Manual, (ed. P. Cherian (2000).
 A. C. Burnell, Indian Antiquary, III.
Gundert, Madras Journal of Literature and Science, XIII, I.
 Rev. J. Monteiro D'Aguir, 'The Magna Carta of St. Thomas Christians', Kerala Society Papers, no. 4.

Synod of Diamper 
When they arrived on the Malabar Coast, the Portuguese noted at least 78 extant church communities closely interwoven with the local community in different parts of Kerala. Quilon, Angamaly, Kaduthuruthy and Cranganore (now known as Kodungallur) had the largest population of Saint Thomas Christians in Kerala. Giovanni Empoli, who came to Quilon in 1503, estimated that there were more than three thousand St. Thomas Christians in Quilon alone.

After 1561, Thomas Christians were branded heretics by the Goa Inquisition. The infamous Synod of Diamper (1599) anathematized all Christians of India who did not submit to Rome. The synod even branded Mar Sabor and Mar Prot as "Nestorian heretics" at the instance of the Portuguese.

Notes

References 

History of Kollam
9th-century bishops of the Church of the East
Saints duos